The Christian scaly-toed gecko (Lepidodactylus christiani), also known commonly as Christian's scaly-toed gecko, is a species of lizard in the family Gekkonidae. The species is endemic to the Philippines.

Etymology
The specific name, christiani, is in honor of United States Army Lieutenant Ralph L. Christian, who assisted Taylor in collecting specimens in the Philippines.

Geographic range
L. christiani is found on the island of Negros in the Philippines.

Habitat

Reproduction
L. christiani is oviparous.

References

Further reading
Rösler H (2000). "Kommentierte Liste der rezent, subrezent und fossil bekannten Geckotaxa (Reptilia: Gekkonomorpha)". Gekkota 2: 28–153. (Lepidodactylus christiani, p. 91). (in German).
Taylor EH (1917). "Snakes and lizards known from Negros, with descriptions of new species and new subspecies". Philippine Journal of Science 12: 353–381 + Plates I–II. (Lepidodactylus christiani, new species, pp. 368–370 + Plate II, figures 1, 1a, 1b).

Lepidodactylus
Reptiles described in 1917